6EBA (95.3 FM) is a multicultural broadcast radio station in Perth, Western Australia. It is Perth's only full-time, community owned and operated multilingual radio station, which began broadcasting from its first studio in View Street, North Perth in 1990.

Hosting 82 different languages, 6EBA's programming includes contributions from new and emerging communities to the older established ethnic communities such as Greek, Italian, Arabic and Bosnian, Serbian, Croatian languages. These programs serve to keep ethnic communities in touch with what is happening at a local, national and international level.

6EBA now has 2 studios, one situated in Fitzgerald Street, North Perth and the other in Maylands.

Notes

External links
 6EBA Official Website

Radio stations in Perth, Western Australia
Community radio stations in Australia